is a football video game developed by Tecmo for the Neo Geo arcade console, published in 1996. This video game is part of the Tecmo World Cup series.

Gameplay 

The game takes place in the World Cup. The player can choose from 32 national teams. The tournament includes 7 games, divided into two groups of four teams and one final. Being an Arcade game, if it is lost only once, it will not be possible to continue playing. In case of a tie, the game is defined by a penalty shoot-out.

As for the gameplay, the novelty is the cross pass button and the possibility of giving a pass forward to a teammate; but the player cannot handle passes in the player's direction. Another novelty is to boost the player's speed through a dribble to reach the rival area and make a powerful shot.

In case of losing, the game can be repeated using the option to continue in which it is possible to increase the strength or speed of the team up to a maximum of three times.

Development and release

Reception 

Tecmo World Soccer '96 received mixed reception from critics since its release. AllGames Kyle Knight criticized the visuals, audio, controls and other design aspects, stating that "The Neo Geo has more than its fair share of soccer games, and any one of them would be a better choice than Tecmo World Soccer '96." MAN!ACs Andreas Knauf compared the game with Super Sidekicks, criticizing the audiovisual presentation and lack of innovations, regarding it as a "Insignificant soccer game". Mega Funs Ulf Schneider felt mixed in regards to the graphics and sound as well as other aspects. Brazilian magazine Super Game Power also compared the title with Super Sidekicks but commended its visuals, sound, controls and fun factor.

Notes

References

External links 
 Tecmo World Soccer '96 at GameFAQs
 Tecmo World Soccer '96 at Killer List of Videogames
 Tecmo World Soccer '96 at MobyGames

1996 video games
Arcade video games
Association football video games
Neo Geo games
Tecmo games
Video games developed in Japan